ABC 25 may refer to one of the following television stations in the United States affiliated with the American Broadcasting Company:

KAVU-TV, Victoria, Texas
KXXV, Waco, Texas
WEEK-DT2, a digital channel of WEEK-TV, Peoria, Illinois
WEHT, Evansville, Indiana
WJXX, Jacksonville, Florida
WOLO-TV, Columbia, South Carolina
WPBF, West Palm Beach, Florida